The Chilukki Stakes is a Grade III American thoroughbred horse race for fillies and mares age three and older over a distance of one mile on the dirt held annually in November  at Churchill Downs in Louisville, Kentucky during the fall meeting. It currently offers a purse of $300,000.

History

The inaugural running of the event was on 1 November 1986 as the Churchill Downs Budweiser Breeders' Cup Handicap at a distance of seven furlongs and was won by James J. Devaney's three-year-old filly Lazer Show who started as the 4/5 odds-on favorite winning by  lengths ono a fast track in a time of 1:22. The event was sponsored by Budweiser and the Breeders' Cup with lucrative stakes.

The following year the event was increased to one mile.

In 1988 the American Graded Stakes Committeeclassified the event with Grade III status.

With continued quality competitors the event attracted the race was upgraded to Grade II in 1992.

In 1995 sponsorship from Budweiser and the Breeders' Cup ceased and the event was renamed to the Churchill Downs Distaff Handicap.

In 2000 the event as an undercard race on the Breeders' Cup program was won by the US Champion Two-Year-Old Filly from the previous year, Chilukki who set a new track record of 1:33.57 for the mile distance. Chilukki was no stranger to Churchill Downs having also set the track record for the short  furlongs distance as a two-year-old and winning the Grade III Debutante Stakes. In 2005 the event was renamed in her honor as the Chilukki Stakes.

In 2019 the event was downgraded to Grade III.

Records
Speed record:
1 mile: 1:33.57 – Chilukki (2000)

Margins:
 6 lengths – Educated Risk (1994)

Most wins:
 No horse has yet to win more than once.

Most wins by a jockey:
 4 – Pat Day (1989, 1993, 1994, 2001)
 4 – Robby Albarado (1997, 2000, 2005, 2010)

Most wins by a trainer:
 3 – Dale L. Romans (2004, 2014, 2019)
 3 – George R. Arnold II  (1988, 1998, 1999)

Most wins by an owner:
 2 – G. Watts Humphrey Jr. (1998, 1999)

Winners

See also
List of American and Canadian Graded races

References

Graded stakes races in the United States
Grade 3 stakes races in the United States
Horse races in the United States
Mile category horse races for fillies and mares
Churchill Downs horse races
Recurring sporting events established in 1986
1986 establishments in Kentucky